Robert S. C. Williams,  is noted for his community service work in Ontario, Canada.

Beginning in Windsor, Ontario, Williams reorganized the city's Society of Saint Vincent de Paul, a benevolent organization.  He also founded Windsor's Catholic Immigration Centre.

In Bramalea, Ontario, Williams founded the St. Leonard's Society of Canada, North America's first half-way house for released prisoners.

Williams was appointed to the Order of Canada in 1986.

References

Members of the Order of Canada
People from Brampton
People from Windsor, Ontario
Living people
Year of birth missing (living people)